The Petite Symphonie in B-flat major is a four-movement work by Charles Gounod, first performed in 1885. It is scored for a wind ensemble of nine players.

Background and premiere
Gounod had composed two symphonies for full orchestra in the 1850s but had since then generally concentrated on opera, songs, and religious music. The work was first given at the Salle Pleyel in Paris on 30 April 1885. The score was not published until 1904.

Structure
The work, which plays for about twenty minutes, is in four movements:
Adagio–Allegro
Andante cantabile (quasi adagio) attacca
Scherzo. Allegro moderato
Finale. Allegretto

References

External links

Compositions by Charles Gounod
Compositions for nonet
Compositions in B-flat major